is a single by Japanese popular music duo Chage and Aska. It was released on March 3, 1993. 
It was number-one on the Oricon Weekly Singles Chart. It was the best-selling single in Japan in 1993, with 2.407 million copies sold and it is the 11th best-selling physical single in Japan, having sold a total of 2.419 million copies.

Track listing

Weekly charts

References

1993 singles
1993 songs
Japanese-language songs
Oricon Weekly number-one singles
Pony Canyon singles
Chage and Aska songs